Stanisław Puchalski, of Puchała coat of arms (5 January 1867, in Wapowce – 16 January 1931, in Warsaw) was an Austro-Hungarian and Polish general.

References
 Österreichisches Biographisches Lexikon 1815–1950, Band VIII., Wien 1983
 Polski Słownik Biograficzny, t. XXIX, Wrocław etc. 1986
 Piotr Stawecki, Słownik Biograficzny Generałów Wojska Polskiego 1918–1939, Warszawa 1994, p. 268-269

1867 births
1931 deaths
Austro-Hungarian generals
Polish generals
Polish legionnaires (World War I)
People from Przemyśl County